Liu Ya (born ) is a Chinese female volleyball player.

With her club Bohai Bank Tianjin she competed at the 2012 FIVB Volleyball Women's Club World Championship.

References

External links
 profile at FIVB.org

1990 births
Living people
Chinese women's volleyball players
Place of birth missing (living people)
21st-century Chinese women